Alpout (also, Alpaut and Ashaga Alpout) is a village and municipality in the Ujar Rayon of Azerbaijan.  It has a population of 3,414.

References 

Populated places in Ujar District